The 2009 Americas Rugby Championship season was the inaugural season of the Americas Rugby Championship. The season featured a Canadian division with four teams representing provinces or regions of Canada, along with international A sides from the U.S. and Argentina.

The Canadian Division played a round robin schedule to determine what two teams would play in the Canadian final. The BC Bears went undefeated in round robin play and defeated the Ontario Blues 12–8 in the Canadian final.

The international finalist was decided in a match between the U.S. Select XV and the Argentina Jaguars. The match was won by the Jaguars 57–10.

The ARC Final pitted the BC Bears against the Argentina Jaguars. The Jaguars gave the Bears their only loss of the season in a 35–11 decision. The Ontario Blues defeated the U.S. Selects to take 3rd place.

Teams
Canadian Division
 BC Bears
 Ontario Blues
 Prairie Wolf Pack
 The Rock

International Teams
 Argentina Jaguars
 USA Select XV

Canadian Division

{| class="wikitable"
| style="background:#cfc;"|     
| Top two advance to semi-finals
|}

Round Robin Matches

Canadian Final

International Play

International Semi-Final Match

Final Matches

3rd-place Match

Championship final Match

Exhibition Matches

References

External links
 Official Website

2009
International rugby union competitions hosted by Canada
2009 rugby union tournaments for clubs
2009 rugby union tournaments for national teams
2009 in Canadian rugby union
2009 in American rugby union
2009 in Argentine rugby union
2009 in North American rugby union
2009 in South American rugby union